Ruby Rees (born Ruby Rees-Wemyss in 1995) is an Australian actress, director and writer. She is best known for playing “Edith” a main character in Picnic at Hanging Rock, in 2018, alongside Natalie Dormer and Samara Weaving.

Education
Rees attended De La Salle College, Malvern before furthering her acting education first at the Larry Moss Masterclass at the 16th Street Actors Studio in Melbourne, Australia then as a full-time student at HB Studio in New York City.

Career
Rees first appeared on screen as a baby in the 1996 Australian movie River Street (film). From 2010, Rees starred in a number of short films Warhead, Once, A Frigid Night,  Bracelet , Good Boy,  Harvey and The Hunt, as well as appearing on television in The Saddle Club in 2008 and Miss Fisher's Murder Mysteries in 2012. Rees starred as “Edith” a main character in Foxtel's Picnic at Hanging Rock, in 2018, alongside Natalie Dormer and Samara Weaving.

Writing and Directing
Rees has written and directed the award-winning play Serpents, which was performed at the St Michael's theatre, Melbourne, Australia in 2010. Rees directed the play Neighbourhood Watch,  directed and screenwrote the short film Alien about a young girl, dealing with racism, which was shortlisted for the Tropfest short film festival, Australia, in 2014.

In 2014, she moved to New York City, where she continued to write and direct plays with The Manhattan Repertory Theatre, her play “Kaston” debuting there in 2015. wrote the play Bad religion in 2016, and wrote and starred in the short film “Harvey.

In 2022, she directed her sister Eva Rees in the latter’s stage writing debut, “he/r (or, remember tomorrow when everything was ok)”, A Fairly Lucid Production, which was staged at Fortyfivedownstairs in Melbourne.

Filmography

Television

References

External links
Ruby Rees facebook

Ruby Rees Profile

1995 births
21st-century Australian actresses
Australian film actresses
Australian television actresses
Living people
Date of birth missing (living people)
Place of birth missing (living people)